Sowood is a village in Calderdale, West Yorkshire, England. The village falls within the Greetland and Stainland ward of Calderdale Council.

Geography
The main road that passes through the village is the B6112, which links the village with Stainland, Greetland, and Outlane. It is very close to the Calderdale and Kirklees district boundary.

See also
Listed buildings in Greetland and Stainland

External links

Villages in West Yorkshire
Elland